Eric Serge Armand Roy (born 26 September 1967) is a French former professional footballer and current manager of Ligue 1 side Brest.

Early life
Eric Serge Armand Roy was born on 26 September 1967 in Nice, Alpes-Maritimes.

Playing career
Roy began playing professional football with OGC Nice.

During his spell in England with Sunderland, he scored once, in a 5–0 win over Walsall in the League Cup.

Coaching and management career

Nice
After retiring, in September 2005 Roy was hired as director of marketing, communication and public relations at his last club OGC Nice. In September 2008, he changed position to director of development and public relations. One year later, he was promoted as sporting director. In March 2010, he was appointed manager of Nice, alongside of a coach holding the professional trainer diploma, which Roy didn't. In addition to his function as sports director, Roy would receive a salary over 13 months of €17,500 in addition to bonuses. He stepped down from the position in November 2011 by mutual agreement while retaining his duties as sports director.

Sacking and prosecution
After a phone call in May 2012 for a prior interview, he was officially dismissed for serious misconduct on 11 June 2012. At the end of the dismissal letter, Roy was accused of having made a 12-day trip to Argentina with an unlicensed agent despite opposition from management and without prior preparation. Contesting the reasons for his dismissal, the employee applied to the Nice Labor Court, which by judgment in June 2013, said that the dismissal had no real and serious cause and condemned the employer for payment of the sums of €22,159 in addition to paid leave relating thereto as a reminder of salary, €97,500 in addition to paid vacation relating thereto as compensation in lieu of notice, €113,750 in severance pay, €37,573 in addition to paid vacation relating to it match and classification bonuses, €90,000 in addition to paid holidays relating thereto as maintenance bonus, €300,000 as damages for unfair dismissal, €3,000 on the basis of the provisions of article 700 of the code of civil procedure besides whole costs.

OGC Nice appealed against that judgment, arguing, first, that Roy should not have received his second remuneration as supervisor from November 2011 to the extent that it was agreed that he would give up, from this date, the daily management of the first team to occupy only its function of sports director. Nice considered, secondly, that the dismissal was perfectly regular, even in the absence of prior referral to the Legal Commission of the Professional Football League, and this insofar as its employee was not covered by the charter professional football, but the collective agreement for administrative and similar football staff (CCPAAF). Thirdly, the Club considered that the dismissal of Roy was perfectly justified in view of his insubordination and his lack of loyalty.

The case ended with Nice paying Roy nearly €300,000 for a wrongful dismissal.

Lens
On 30 September 2017, he was appointed sporting director of RC Lens. He left the position in April 2019.

Watford
In December 2019, Roy took the role of sporting director at Premier League club Watford.

Brest
On 3 January 2023, Roy became the manager of Ligue 1 side Stade Brestois 29.

TV
In 2012, he became a consultant for the sports channel beIN Sports where he was a consultant in the program Le Club from Monday to Thursday at 7 p.m. and Friday during the pre-match and the post-match of the Ligue 1 games with Florian Genton. He left the position in 2017.

From 2019, he became a consultant for France Télévisions. He was a commentator on the matches of the Coupe de France and the Coupe de la Ligue with Kader Boudaoud (until December 2019) and later Fabien Lévêque.

References

External links

 
 
 

1967 births
Living people
Footballers from Nice
French footballers
Association football midfielders
OGC Nice players
SC Toulon players
Olympique Lyonnais players
Olympique de Marseille players
Sunderland A.F.C. players
ES Troyes AC players
Rayo Vallecano players
Ligue 1 players
Ligue 2 players
Premier League players
La Liga players
French expatriate footballers
Expatriate footballers in England
Expatriate footballers in Spain
French expatriate sportspeople in England
French expatriate sportspeople in Spain
French football managers
OGC Nice managers
Stade Brestois 29 managers
Ligue 1 managers
Association football coaches
Watford F.C. non-playing staff